Curtis Booth (12 October 1891 – 29 October 1949), sometimes known as Tommy Booth, was an English football player and manager. He played in the Football League for Newcastle United, Norwich City and Accrington Stanley, for Leeds City as a wartime guest and for Wallsend Elm Villa. After retiring as a player, Booth managed Accrington Stanley, Wormatia Worms, RC Paris and coached in Germany, Turkey and the Netherlands.

Personal life 
Booth enlisted in the British Army in December 1915 to fight in the First World War. He served as a private in the Durham Light Infantry and saw action on the Somme and at the Third Ypres. Booth was wounded in action at Villers-Bretonneux in August 1918 and was demobilized in August 1919.

Career statistics

References

External links
Biography

1891 births
1949 deaths
Footballers from Gateshead
Association football inside forwards
English footballers
Newcastle United F.C. players
Norwich City F.C. players
Accrington Stanley F.C. (1891) players
Leeds City F.C. wartime guest players
English football managers
Accrington Stanley F.C. (1891) managers
Wormatia Worms managers
Racing Club de France Football managers
Durham Light Infantry soldiers
British Army personnel of World War I
English expatriate football managers
English expatriate sportspeople in France
English expatriate sportspeople in the Netherlands
Expatriate football managers in France
Expatriate football managers in the Netherlands
English expatriate sportspeople in Germany
English expatriate sportspeople in Turkey
Expatriate football managers in Germany